The Marshall Library may refer to:

 Marshall Library of Economics in Cambridge, England
 The Marshall Library of the George C. Marshall Foundation in Lexington, Kentucky
 Drinko Library or Morrow Library on the campus of Marshall University in Huntington, West Virginia